William Joliffe (c.1622 – 1712) was an English merchant and politician who served as Member of Parliament for Poole from 1698 to 1705.

References 

1622 births
1712 deaths
English MPs 1698–1700
English MPs 1701
English MPs 1701–1702
English MPs 1702–1705
People from Poole